Matthew Kirkham Needham Collens, CMG, CBE (died 31 December 1957) was a British police officer; and the Inspector General of Police of the Gold Coast Police Service from 26 May 1949 to the end of his life, when Gold Coast had become Ghana.

He had previously been in Nigeria, and replaced Richard Waverley Head Ballantine in the position, arriving on 21 February 1949.

He was awarded the CBE in 1955. He died in Catterick Military Hospital.

References

1957 deaths
Ghanaian police officers
Ghanaian Inspector Generals of Police
Companions of the Order of St Michael and St George
Commanders of the Order of the British Empire
British colonial police officers
British people in the British Gold Coast